Ali Hassain Hussain (born 1935) is an Iraqi weightlifter. He competed in the men's bantamweight event at the 1960 Summer Olympics.

References

1935 births
Living people
Iraqi male weightlifters
Olympic weightlifters of Iraq
Weightlifters at the 1960 Summer Olympics
Sportspeople from Baghdad
20th-century Iraqi people